Bastardo is a 2013 Tunisian drama film written and directed by Nejib Belkadhi. It was screened in the Contemporary World Cinema section at the 2013 Toronto International Film Festival.

Plot
Mohsen, "the bastard", was found in a dustbin 30 years ago by his adoptive father, and has always been rejected by the residents of the rundown district where he lives. When he is fired from his job, a mobile phone company comes to install a relay tower on the roof of his modest house in exchange for a monthly stipend, Bastardo has a reversal of fortune. The aerial makes Mohsen a wealthy and respected man, to the disgruntlement of the village mobster Larnouba.

Director Belkadhi says: 
"Power and corruption have been part of our lives for decades, and less than three years after the revolution, I am still wondering if we made it. Back in 2007, when I began writing the script, I had one thought in mind: my main character Bastardo shouldn’t choose power. It’s rather power that chooses him and radically changes him."

Cast
 Abdel Moneem Chouayat as Mohsen Bastardo
 Chedly Arfaoui as Larnouba
 Lobna Noomene as Bent Essengra
 Taoufik El Bahri as Khlifa
 Lassad Ben Abdallah as Khadra
 Issa Harath as Am Salah
 Latifa El Gafsi
 Ramzy Slim
 Bilel Briki

Production
Bastardo received a grant from the Doha Film Institute in 2011.
The original, uncut version of the movie was 3 hours and 20 minutes' long.

References

External links
 

2013 films
2013 drama films
2010s Arabic-language films
Tunisian drama films